Wadi al-Hawarith was a Palestinian bedouin camping site in the Tulkarm Subdistrict. It was depopulated at the outbreak of the 1948 Arab–Israeli War on March 15, 1948, following the 1947–48 Civil War in Mandatory Palestine. It was located 16.5 km northwest of Tulkarm. Wadi al-Hawarith was mostly destroyed with the exception of four houses.

In 1945, Wadi al-Hawarith had a total population of 1,330.

The camping site today corresponds more or less to Nahal Alexander National Park, the national park covering what is now called Hefer Valley, the namesake of Hefer Valley Regional Council.

History

British Mandate era
In the 1922 census of Palestine  conducted by the British Mandate  authorities,  Wadi al-Hawarith had 812 inhabitants; 810 Muslims and 2 Christians,  where the Christians were one Roman Catholic and one Maronite.  The population had increased in the 1931 census to 1,112; 1,077 Muslims, 30 Jews and 5 Christians, in a total of 255 houses.

In 1933, Zionist settled  three places close to Wadi al-Hawarith: Kfar Vitkin  was south of village land, Mikhmoret to the west of  Wadi al-Hawarith, north, and Ma'abarot southwest of  Wadi al-Hawarith, south. Neither of these settlements were on village land.

In 1934  Kfar Haroeh was settled  on what was traditionally village land.

Village Statistics, compiled in 1938 by the Government Office of Statistics, recorded the population of Wadi al-Hawarith as 2974; out of them, 1716 Jews and 1258 non-Jews.

The Jewish National Fund acquired lands amounting to 30,800 dunams at auction from absentee landlords and initiated legal proceedings to evict the current tenants, who were impoverished Bedouin that were resisting their removal. The British-appointed Shaw Commission notes that a "state of extreme apprehension" gripped the Palestinian public at large, whose members feared that they too would suffer the same fate of displacement at the hands of Jewish colonists.

In the 1945 statistics,  Wadi al-Hawarith (North) had 850 inhabitants, while Wadi al-Hawarith (South) had 480; 1,330 in total, all Muslims,  and the total land area was 9,812 dunams. Arabs used 960 dunams for cereals,  while they owned 1,555 dunams of uncultivable land.

In 1947 Zionists also settled Geulei Teiman on what was traditionally village land.

1948 war
The Arab Liberation Army instructed in mid-February 1948 the inhabitants of Wadi al-Hawarith to evacuate their women and property to the Arab area, which it is unclear if they did. After an ambush by Haganah the month after, which killed three or four Arabs, the inhabitants began to leave but stressing "that the Jews all along had promised them that nothing bad would happen to them" if they stayed. The British mandate authorities advised them to leave and helped with a military escort. The evacuation apparently took several weeks.

In early May, advisers of the Alexandroni Brigade recommended destroying the homes in Wadi al-Hawarith, except those of stone "that may be made fit for human [i.e., Jewish] habitation".

The Canadian Jewish Chronicle reported from Jerusalem on March 29, published on April 2, saying that the sudden mass exodus of Arab villagers "heightened the belief here that Arab gangs are preparing for an all-out assault on Tel Aviv and Jewish coastal areas in the immediate future." According to this article, the evacuees had always had friendly relations with the settlers. The evacuation apparently was coordinated between the Jews and Sheik Abu Kishek, head of a prominent tribe in the Tel Aviv area, and states that Sheik Kishek had spent the previous month at Mufti headquarters, and "reportedly got instructions to evacuate the area."

References

Bibliography

 (p. 99 ff)

External links
 Welcome To Wadi al-Hawarith, Palestine Remembered
Wadi al-Hawarith, Zochrot
Survey of Western Palestine, Map 10:   IAA, Wikimedia commons

Arab villages depopulated during the 1948 Arab–Israeli War
District of Tulkarm